Erna Lúðvíksdóttir (born 1961) is an Icelandic former multi-sport athlete. She played 98 games for Icelandic national handball team and 13 games for the Icelandic national football team. In 1988, she was named the Best Defender in the Icelandic top-tier handball league.

Early life
Erna was born in New York, United States, in 1961 to Icelanders Lúðvík Jónsson, the CEO of Ísafoldsprentsmiðja, and Guðfinna Elentinusdóttir, a former gymnast. She was one of five siblings, including future footballer Gunnar Lúðvíksson.

Football
Erna started her senior team career with Valur during the winter of 1976–77 when the team participated in the national indoor football tournament. The following summer, she played for Valur when it participated in the national tournament for the first time. She scored Valur's first goal of the season, in a 6–0 victory against Víðir Garður. In 1978, she helped Valur win the national championship. She later transitioned from outfielder to goalkeeper and as such, helped Valur win the national championship and the Icelandic Cup in 1986. She retired from football in 1987 to focus on her handball career.

National team career
She played 13 games for the Icelandic national football team from 1982 to 1987 and was the captain of the team in her last four games.

Titles
Icelandic Championships: 2
1978, 1986

Icelandic Cup: 4
1984, 1985, 1986, 1987

Handball
Erna came up through the junior teams of Íþróttafélagið Grótta but transferred to Ármann in 1977 as Grótta did not field a senior team. She played one season with Ármann before transferring to Valur in 1978. She went on to play several seasons in the Icelandic top-tier Úrvalsdeild kvenna, winning the national championship in 1983. In 1988, she led Valur to victory in the Icelandic Cup, scoring a game high 8 goals in Valur's 25–20 cup finals win against Stjarnan. She played her last six seasons with ZMC Amicitia Zürich in Switzerland. She retired from handball in 1995 but made a brief comeback with Amicitia during the 1996 playoffs before retiring for good.

National team career
She played 98 games for the Icelandic national handball team, scoring 148 goals.

Titles and awards

Titles
 Icelandic Championships:
1983
 Icelandic Cup:
1988

Individual awards
Úrvalsdeild kvenna Defender of the Year:
1988

References

External links

1961 births
Living people
Erna Ludviksdottir
Erna Ludviksdottir
Erna Ludviksdottir
Erna Ludviksdottir
Women's association footballers not categorized by position
Erna Ludviksdottir